Marcelo Demarco (born February 19, 1971), also known as Mark Demark, is an Uruguayan DJ and producer. He began his professional career in the early 1990s in Montevideo's incipient rave scene. His style evolved from progressive house at his early stages to a very distinctive underground techno. In 2005 he created SexiBeats records where he released most of his productions but the Label never actually generate enough revenue and was eventually left behind. In 2011 he found Suro Records this time with better luck, the catalogue include artists like Alex Arnout, El Mundo & Satori, Cosmic Boys and Brisboys and had reached the top techno chart several times and have released his music on Suro Records, Dechapter, Cerebro, 0db recordings, Gorilla Recordings and Vitamina Records. He is the oldest techno dj still active in Uruguay.

Discography

References

1971 births
Living people
Uruguayan DJs
Uruguayan producers